Wookieepedia: The Star Wars Wiki is an online encyclopedia for information about the Star Wars  universe—including information on all the films, as well as Clone Wars, The Clone Wars and its introductory film, Rebels, the Star Wars Expanded Universe, and any upcoming Star Wars material. It is a specialized wiki created to be an extensive encyclopedia of the Star Wars universe with some articles reaching up to 60,000 words, and is written almost entirely from an in-universe perspective. The name Wookieepedia is a portmanteau of Wookiee and encyclopedia, a pun on the name of Wikipedia. The logo, too, is a visual pun showing the incomplete second Death Star as opposed to Wikipedia's incomplete "jigsaw logo".

History
Wookieepedia was conceived by Steven Greenwood and created at the request of hosting site Wikia by Chad Barbry in 2005. On 6 February 2005, Greenwood and Barbry discussed details on a Wikipedia talk page which led to the wiki's creation. Barbry also conceived the name "Wookiepedia", which was later respelled with an extra 'e'. On March 4, 2005, Wookieepedia was launched at Wikia.

Wookieepedia was the most-visited wiki hosted by Wikia by April 2005. In 2015, it drew 3.7 million monthly visitors. On November 28, 2005, Wookieepedia was selected as the Sci-Fi Channel's "Sci-Fi Site of the Week." In January 2006, the site was featured as the Wikia of the Month.

, the English-language version of the wiki contains over 180,000 articles, making it the seventh-largest Wikia in terms of article count, ahead of other wikis such as Memory Alpha and WoWWiki. Wikia hosts Star Wars wikis in many other languages, and Wookieepedia also coordinates its efforts with the German language wiki called Jedipedia.net and the Polish language Biblioteka Ossus.

After the Star Wars expanded universe was declared non-canonical to the future works and rebranded as Star Wars Legends in April 2014, Wookieepedia implemented separate "Canon" and "Legends" tabs for subjects that appeared both before and after the continuity reboot. "Legends" tab only includes information from sources released prior to the 2014 reboot, while "Canon" tab contains information from works published from 2015 onwards, including the movies released under The Walt Disney Company. An exception to this rule was made for the content of the Star Wars: The Old Republic MMORPG, which has seen several expansions after 2015 but is still considered "Legends". Both tabs include information from Episodes I-VI and The Clone Wars TV series.

In late March 2021, Wookieepedia held a vote to ban deadnaming, which triggered debate within Star Wars fan circles around the naming of the non-binary artist Robin Pronovost's article on the site. In response to the situation, Fandom, the wiki hosting service which hosts Wookieepedia, updated its terms of use policy to prohibit deadnaming across its websites. On behalf of the Wookieepedia administration team, Fandom also permanently banned two administrators, citing a pattern of "bullying and intimidation." In addition, Wookieepedia's administration apologized to Pronovost for the duress that they endured as a result of the website's deadnaming vote.

Reception
Actors in the Star Wars franchise have used Wookieepedia to have a better understanding of the Star Wars universe and better portray their characters, including Felicity Jones who portrayed Jyn Erso in the 2016 film Rogue One: A Star Wars Story and Alden Ehrenreich who portrayed young Han Solo in the 2018 film Solo: A Star Wars Story.

References

External links

 on Fandom

Fandom (website) wikis
Internet properties established in 2005
Science fiction websites
Star Wars fandom
Works about Star Wars
American online encyclopedias